La Vall de Gallinera is a valley and a municipality in north-east Alicante, Spain, included in the Marina Alta comarca. It is formed by the nuclei of Benirrama, Benialí, Benissivà, Benitaia, Carroja, Alpatró, Llombai and Benissili. All these settlements constitute a single municipality. The total combined population at the moment is around 600.

History
Like in all other valleys of the interior of Marina Alta, the Moors occupied the territory for almost six centuries. After the expulsion of the Moriscos in 1609, the Vall de Gallinera became deserted and the Duke of Gandia, to whom this area was given, brought from Majorca 150 families to repopulate the valley. As per Cavanilles: "it is easy still to see the origin of all of them in the accent and dialect of its inhabitants. They are very hard working, all they take advantage of it and they live contentedly in that delicious enclosure." Indeed, in this valley, Valencian is heavily influenced by Balearic Catalan.

Economy
The main businesses of the area are the cultivation of cherries, almonds and olives, and rural tourism.

Sources
 Ayuntamiento de Vall de Gallinera 
 Índice estadístico municipal de Vall de Gallinera. Unidad de Documentación de la Diputación de Alicante 
 Portal Interactivo de Vall de Gallinera 
 Web de Vall de Gallinera

References

Municipalities in the Province of Alicante
Valleys of Spain
Landforms of the Valencian Community